Rachid Baldé (born 24 February 2000) is a Bissau-Guinean footballer who plays as a midfielder for Kastoria fc.

Career

As a youth player, Baldé joined the youth academy of Portuguese fourth tier side Povoense. In 2012, he joined the youth academy of Benfica in the Portuguese top flight. Following a spell in the Brentford academy, Baldé started his senior career with English second tier club Stoke City. In 2018, he was sent on loan to Curzon Ashton in the English sixth tier.

In 2020, Baldé signed for Portuguese third tier team Fátima. In 2021, he signed for Șomuz Fălticeni in the Romanian third tier, where he suffered a knee injury. Before the second half of 2021–22, Baldé signed for Moldovan top flight outfit Zimbru. On 12 March 2022, he debuted for Zimbru during a 2–1 win over Bălți.o. On 31 January 2023, Balde signed for Greek third tier team Kastoria fc.

References

External links
 Rachid Baldé at ZeroZero

2000 births
Association football midfielders
Bissau-Guinean expatriate footballers
Bissau-Guinean expatriate sportspeople in England
Bissau-Guinean expatriate sportspeople in Moldova
Bissau-Guinean expatriate sportspeople in Romania
Bissau-Guinean footballers
Campeonato de Portugal (league) players
C.D. Fátima players
Curzon Ashton F.C. players
Expatriate footballers in England
Expatriate footballers in Moldova
Expatriate footballers in Romania
FC Zimbru Chișinău players
Liga III players
Living people
Moldovan Super Liga players
National League (English football) players
Stoke City F.C. players